Keeper of the Flame is an album by saxophonist Richie Cole recorded in 1978 and released on the Muse label.

Reception

Allmusic noted "This is one of altoist Richie Cole's best-ever albums".

Track listing 
All compositions by Richie Cole except where noted
 "As Time Goes By" (Herman Hupfeld) – 6:59
 "I Can't Get Started" (Vernon Duke, Ira Gershwin) – 4:51
 "Keeper of the Flame" – 6:09
 "Harolds House of Jazz" (Cole, David Lahm) – 4:58
 "Holiday for Strings" (David Rose) – 5:45
 "New York Afternoon" – 3:59
 "Strange Groove" – 4:57

Personnel 
Richie Cole – alto saxophone
Vic Juris – guitar
Harold Mabern – piano
Rick Laird – bass
Eddie Gladden – drums
Eddie Jefferson (tracks 4 & 6), The Alt-Tettes (track 7) – vocals

References 

Richie Cole (musician) albums
1979 albums
Muse Records albums
Albums recorded at Van Gelder Studio